Gangesvara Anantavarman Chodaganga Deva was an Eastern Ganga  monarch who reigned between 1077 CE to 1150 CE. He was the ruler of the Kalinga region from river Ganga to Godavari, and later the early medieval Odisha region with the incorporation of the constituent regions with the decline of the Somavamshis.

Life and reign

He was the son of Kalingadhipati Rajaraja Deva I alias Devendravarman and Kalinga Mahadevi Rajasundari and Grandson of Trikalingadhipati Anantavarman Vajrahasta Deva 5th . His father defeated Kulottunga I and own chola country according to Dirghasi Stone inscription. Rajasundari the daughter of emperor Virarajendra Chola and grand daughter of Chola king Rajendra Chola I. However, historian S.N. Sen states that Anantavarman was the maternal grandson of Kulottunga I. The Jagannath Temple at Puri was rebuilt in the 11th century atop its ruins by Anantavarman Chodaganga. He was known as the first Gajapati/Kunjaradhiparti as per Ronaki Stone inscription.
Emperor Chodaganga was originally a Shaivite from Srimukhalingam(which was in Kalinga/Odisha till 1936, as part of Undivided Ganjam District). But he embraced Sri Vaishnavism under the influence of Sri Ramanuja when the latter visited the Sri Jagannath Puri temple. In his Sindurapura grant(1118 A.D) Anantavarma styles himself Paramavaishnava. He re-established Kurmanathaswamy temple, Srikurmam after Sri Ramanujacharjya's visit to Kalinga. Despite being related to Anantavarman, Kulothunga Chola I did not stop from burning Anantavarman's empire. Tamil historians propose that it was probably because the king failed to pay his rent for two consecutive years. He was ousted by Kulothunga's general Karunakara Thondaiman and this victory is detailed in the Tamil classic Kalingattupparani. However, this could be a far fetch from the actual truth considering that such poems often exaggerate the Kings they are praising and often overlook the defeats the Kings have faced. Monarchs from this region of the subcontinent regularly assumed the title Chodaganga Deva throughout the ancient and medieval periods to allude to their Chola and Eastern Ganga heritage. 
From various inscriptions it is known that King Anantavarman Chodaganga Deva established the present temple some time near the end of the eleventh century. A copper plate inscription made by King Rajaraja III found on the Tirumala Venkateswara Temple near the north entrance states that Jagannath temple was built by Gangesvara, i.e., Anantavarman Chodaganga Deva.

Later, King Ananga Bhima Deva II (1170–1198) did much to continue the work of Chodaganga Deva, building the walls around the temple and many of the other shrines on the temple grounds. He is thus often considered one of the builders of the temple. He also did much to establish the regulations around the service to the Deity.

A scion of this dynasty made extensive donations to the Koneswaram temple, Trincomalee on Puthandu, 1223 CE in the name of King  Chodaganga Deva. Shortly afterwards, the Konark temple was constructed in Odisha. A brother of the king titled Ulagaikonda Permadi is known to us from several inscriptions.

Gallery

Sources

References

1150 deaths
Eastern Ganga dynasty
11th-century Indian monarchs
12th-century Indian monarchs